National Secondary Route 151, or just Route 151 (or ) is a National Road Route of Costa Rica, located in the Guanacaste province.

Description
In Guanacaste province the route covers Carrillo canton (Palmira, Sardinal districts).

References

Highways in Costa Rica